Thomas  Addis Emmet Weadock (January 1, 1850 – November 18, 1938) was a judge and politician from the U.S. state of Michigan.

Weadock was born in Ballygarrett in County Wexford on the island of Ireland (then a part of the U.K.). He immigrated to the United States in infancy with his parents, Lewis Weadock and Mary (Cullen) Weadock, who settled on a farm near St. Marys, Ohio. He was educated in the common schools and the Union School at St. Marys, and taught school in the counties of Auglaize, Shelby, and Miami for five years. His brother, George W. Weadock, was a mayor of Saginaw and the father and grandfather of state senators.

Weadock graduated from the law department of the University of Michigan at Ann Arbor in March 1873 and was admitted to the bar the same year commencing practice in Bay City. The following year, he married Mary E. Tarsney a sister of two U.S. Representatives: Timothy E. Tarsney of Michigan and John Charles Tarsney of Missouri.

Weadock served in the State militia 1874-1877; was prosecuting attorney of Bay County in 1877 and 1878; chairman of the Democratic State conventions in 1883 and 1894; mayor of Bay City 1883-1885; and member of the board of education of Bay City in 1884. His first wife, Mary, died in 1889. Later, in 1893, he would marry Nannie E. Curtiss, who died in 1927.

In 1890, Weadock was elected as a Democrat from  Michigan's 10th congressional district to the 52nd Congress and was re-elected in 1892 to the 53rd Congress, serving from March 4, 1891 to March 3, 1895.  He was chairman of the Committee on Mines and Mining during the 53rd Congress.  He declined to be a candidate for reelection in 1894, but was a delegate at large to the 1896 Democratic National Convention.

After leaving Congress, Weadock resumed the practice of law in Bay City, and later moved to Detroit continuing to practice.  He was an unsuccessful Democratic candidate for judge of the Michigan Supreme Court in 1904. Eight years later, he was appointed a professor of law in the University of Detroit in 1912. Six years later in 1933, he was appointed an associate justice of the state supreme court.

Thomas A. E. Weadock was also a member of the American Bar Association and the Ancient Order of Hibernians. He died in Detroit at the age of eighty-eight and is interred in St. Patrick's Cemetery of Bay City.

References

External links

1850 births
1938 deaths
American militiamen
Burials in Michigan
Democratic Party members of the United States House of Representatives from Michigan
Irish emigrants to the United States (before 1923)
Lawyers from Detroit
Mayors of places in Michigan
Justices of the Michigan Supreme Court
People from County Wexford
People from St. Mary's, Ohio
Politicians from Bay City, Michigan
University of Detroit Mercy faculty
University of Michigan Law School alumni
19th-century American lawyers
19th-century American politicians
20th-century American judges